Maria Adelaide Aboim Inglez (19322008) was a Portuguese communist activist who opposed the authoritarian Estado Novo regime in Portugal.

Early life
Maria Adelaide Dias Coelho was born in Castelo Branco, Portugal on 27 March 1932. She was the daughter of Alfredo Dias Coelho and Juliana Augusta Dias Coelho, who were active communists. She had 8 siblings. One brother was José Dias Coelho, a painter and sculptor who played an important role in the Portuguese Communist Party (PCP) and was murdered by the PIDE, the political police of the Estado Novo.  In October 1952, she was arrested while collecting signatures in support of a peace treaty between the Great Powers and for the prohibition of nuclear weapons. She remained in Caxias prison near Lisbon for five months, being released in March 1953 without ever going to trial.

Clandestine existence
At the age of 21 in 1953 she married Carlos Hanhemann Saavedra de Aboim Inglez, who also played a leading role in the PCP and spent a total of 10 years in prison. Her mother-in-law was Maria Isabel Aboim Inglez. Shortly after marrying she joined the PCP and the couple went underground, becoming part of the PCP's clandestine network. In June 1959, the day after her husband had been arrested, she was arrested for the second time, when the clandestine house where she lived with her husband and daughter, Margarida, was visited by the PIDE. She locked the door, in order to give time to burn papers that could betray her collaborators, while the police fired at the lock to break it open. Aboim Inglez and her daughter, then 4 years old, were taken to the PIDE headquarters and, later, to Caxias prison. Aboim Inglez demanded that her daughter be handed over to her grandmother, Maria Isabel Aboim Inglês, which happened only about a week after her arrest. 

During her time in prison, Aboim Inglez was repeatedly punished for refusing to comply with the regulations and it was not until October 1960 that she was formally tried in court, when she was acquitted and released. She was tried again on another case in January 1961 and was then given an 18-month suspended sentence. She continued to carry out tasks for the PCP, supporting political prisoners and campaigning for their liberation. Between 1968 and 1975 she lived in Moscow with her husband, Margarida and their second daughter, Isabel.

After the 25 April 1974 Carnation Revolution that overthrew the Estado Novo, Maria Adelaide Aboim Inglez returned to Portugal and worked at the headquarters of the PCP as a bookkeeper. A few years later, she moved to a Communist Party bookstore, where she worked until a few days before her death, when she suffered a stroke. She died on 29 February 2008.

References

Portuguese anti-fascists
Prisoners and detainees of Portugal
Portuguese communists
1932 births
2008 deaths
People from Castelo Branco, Portugal